Calluga lophoceras is a moth in the family Geometridae. It is found in India.

References

Moths described in 1931
Eupitheciini
Moths of Asia